

Events

Pre-1600
1099 – Some 15,000 starving Christian soldiers begin the siege of Jerusalem by marching in a religious procession around the city as its Muslim defenders watch.
1283 – Roger of Lauria, commanding the Aragonese fleet, defeats an Angevin fleet sent to put down a rebellion on Malta.
1497 – Vasco da Gama sets sail on the first direct European voyage to India.
1579 – Our Lady of Kazan, a holy icon of the Russian Orthodox Church, is discovered underground in the city of Kazan, Tatarstan.

1601–1900
1663 – Charles II of England grants John Clarke a Royal charter to Rhode Island.
1709 – Peter I of Russia defeats Charles XII of Sweden at the Battle of Poltava, thus effectively ending Sweden's status as a major power in Europe.
1716 – The Battle of Dynekilen forces Sweden to abandon its invasion of Norway.
1758 – French forces hold Fort Carillon against the British at Ticonderoga, New York.
1760 – British forces defeat French forces in the last naval battle in New France.
1775 – The Olive Branch Petition is signed by the Continental Congress of the Thirteen Colonies of North America.
1776 – Church bells (possibly including the Liberty Bell) are rung after John Nixon delivers the first public reading of the Declaration of Independence of the United States. 
1808 – Promulgation of the Bayonne Statute, a royal charter Joseph Bonaparte intended as the basis for his rule as king of Spain.
1822 – Chippewas turn over a huge tract of land in Ontario to the United Kingdom.
1853 – The Perry Expedition arrives in Edo Bay with a treaty requesting trade.
1859 – King Charles XV & IV accedes to the throne of Sweden–Norway.
1864 – Ikedaya Incident: The Choshu Han shishi's planned Shinsengumi sabotage on Kyoto, Japan at Ikedaya.
1874 – The Mounties begin their March West.
1876 – The Hamburg massacre prior to the 1876 United States presidential election results in the deaths of six African-Americans of the Republican Party, along with one white assailant.
1879 – Sailing ship  departs San Francisco carrying an ill-fated expedition to the North Pole.
1889 – The first issue of The Wall Street Journal is published.
1892 – St. John's, Newfoundland is devastated in the Great Fire of 1892.
1898 – The death of crime boss Soapy Smith, killed in the Shootout on Juneau Wharf, releases Skagway, Alaska from his iron grip.

1901–present
1912 – Henrique Mitchell de Paiva Couceiro leads an unsuccessful royalist attack against the First Portuguese Republic in Chaves.
1932 – The Dow Jones Industrial Average reaches its lowest level of the Great Depression, closing at 41.22.
1933 – The first rugby union test match between the Wallabies of Australia and the Springboks of South Africa is played at Newlands Stadium in Cape Town.
1937 – Turkey, Iran, Iraq, and Afghanistan sign the Treaty of Saadabad.
1947 – Reports are broadcast that a UFO crash-landed in Roswell, New Mexico in what became known as the Roswell UFO incident.
1948 – The United States Air Force accepts its first female recruits into a program called Women in the Air Force (WAF).
1960 – Francis Gary Powers is charged with espionage resulting from his flight over the Soviet Union.
1962 – Ne Win besieges and blows up the Rangoon University Student Union building to crush the Student Movement.
1966 – King Mwambutsa IV Bangiriceng of Burundi is deposed by his son Prince Charles Ndizi.
1968 – The Chrysler wildcat strike begins in Detroit, Michigan.
1970 – Richard Nixon delivers a special congressional message enunciating Native American self-determination as official US Indian policy, leading to the Indian Self-Determination and Education Assistance Act of 1975.
1972 – Israeli Mossad assassinate Palestinian writer Ghassan Kanafani.
1980 – The inaugural 1980 State of Origin game is won by Queensland who defeat New South Wales 20–10 at Lang Park.
  1980   – Aeroflot Flight 4225 crashes near Almaty International Airport in the then Kazakh Soviet Socialist Republic (present day Kazakhstan) killing all 166 people on board.
1982 – A failed assassination attempt against Iraqi president Saddam Hussein results in the Dujail Massacre over the next several months.
1988 – The Island Express train travelling from Bangalore to Kanyakumari derails on the Peruman bridge and falls into Ashtamudi Lake, killing 105 passengers and injuring over 200 more.
1994 – Kim Jong-il begins to assume supreme leadership of North Korea upon the death of his father, Kim Il-sung.
2003 – Sudan Airways Flight 139 crashes near Port Sudan Airport during an emergency landing attempt, killing 116 of the 117 people on board.
2011 – Space Shuttle Atlantis is launched in the final mission of the U.S. Space Shuttle program.
2014 – Israel launches an offensive on Gaza amid rising tensions following the kidnapping and murder of three Israeli teenagers.
2021 – President Joe Biden announces that the official conclusion of U.S. involvement in the War in Afghanistan will be on August 31, 2021.
2022 – Former Japanese prime minister Shinzo Abe is assassinated while giving a speech in Nara.

Births

Pre-1600
1478 – Gian Giorgio Trissino, Italian linguist, poet, and playwright (d. 1550)
1528 – Emmanuel Philibert, Duke of Savoy (d. 1580)
1538 – Alberto Bolognetti, Roman Catholic cardinal (d. 1585)
1545 – Carlos, Prince of Asturias (d. 1568)
1593 – Artemisia Gentileschi, Italian painter (d. 1653)

1601–1900
1621 – Jean de La Fontaine, French author and poet (d. 1695)
1760 – Christian Kramp, French mathematician and academic (d. 1826)
1766 – Dominique Jean Larrey, French surgeon (d. 1842)
1779 – Giorgio Pullicino, Maltese painter and architect (d. 1851)
1819 – Francis Leopold McClintock, Irish admiral and explorer (d. 1907)
1830 – Frederick W. Seward, American lawyer and politician, 6th United States Assistant Secretary of State (d. 1915)
1831 – John Pemberton, American chemist and pharmacist, invented Coca-Cola (d. 1888)
1836 – Joseph Chamberlain, English businessman and politician, Secretary of State for the Colonies (d. 1914)
1838 – Eli Lilly, American soldier, chemist, and businessman, founded Eli Lilly and Company (d. 1898)
  1838   – Ferdinand von Zeppelin, German general and businessman, founded the Zeppelin Airship Company (d. 1917)
1839 – John D. Rockefeller, American businessman and philanthropist, founded the Standard Oil Company (d. 1937)
1851 – Arthur Evans, English archaeologist and academic (d. 1941)
  1851   – John Murray, Australian politician, 23rd Premier of Victoria (d. 1916)
1857 – Alfred Binet, French psychologist and graphologist (d. 1911)
1867 – Käthe Kollwitz, German painter and sculptor (d. 1945)
1876 – Alexandros Papanastasiou, Greek sociologist and politician, Prime Minister of Greece (d. 1936)
1882 – Percy Grainger, Australian-American pianist and composer (d. 1961)
1885 – Ernst Bloch, German philosopher, author, and academic (d. 1977)
  1885   – Hugo Boss, German fashion designer, founded Hugo Boss (d. 1948)
1890 – Stanton Macdonald-Wright, American painter (d. 1973)
1892 – Richard Aldington, English author and poet (d. 1962)
  1892   – Pavel Korin, Russian painter (d. 1967)
1893 – R. Carlyle Buley, American historian and author (d. 1968)
1894 – Pyotr Kapitsa, Russian physicist and academic, Nobel Prize laureate (d. 1984)
1895 – Igor Tamm, Russian physicist and academic, Nobel Prize laureate (d. 1971)
1898 – Melville Ruick, American actor (d. 1972)
1900 – George Antheil, American pianist, composer, and author (d. 1959)

1901–present
1904 – Henri Cartan, French mathematician and academic (d. 2008)
1905 – Leonid Amalrik, Russian animator and director (d. 1997)
1906 – Philip Johnson, American architect, designed the IDS Center and PPG Place (d. 2005)
1907 – George W. Romney, American businessman and politician, 43rd Governor of Michigan (d. 1995)
1908 – Louis Jordan, American singer-songwriter, saxophonist, and actor (d. 1975)
  1908   – Nelson Rockefeller, American businessman and politician, 41st Vice President of the United States (d. 1979)
  1908   – V. K. R. Varadaraja Rao, Indian economist, politician, professor and educator (d. 1991)
1909 – Alan Brown, English soldier (d. 1971)
  1909   – Ike Petersen, American football back (d. 1995)
1910 – Carlos Betances Ramírez, Puerto Rican general (d. 2001)
1911 – Ken Farnes, English cricketer (d. 1941)
1913 – Alejandra Soler, Spanish politician (d. 2017)
1914 – Jyoti Basu, Indian politician, 6th Chief Minister of West Bengal (d. 2010)
  1914   – Billy Eckstine, American singer and trumpet player (d. 1993)
1915 – Neil D. Van Sickle, American Air Force major general (d. 2019)
  1915   – Lowell English, United States Marine Corps general (d. 2005)
1916 – Jean Rouverol, American author, actress and screenwriter (d. 2017)
1917 – Pamela Brown, English actress (d. 1975)
  1917   – Faye Emerson, American actress (d. 1983)
  1917   – J. F. Powers, American novelist and short story writer (d. 1999)
1918 – Paul B. Fay, American businessman, soldier, and diplomat, 12th United States Secretary of the Navy (d. 2009)
  1918   – Irwin Hasen, American illustrator (d. 2015)
  1918   – Oluf Reed-Olsen, Norwegian resistance member and pilot (d. 2002)
  1918   – Julia Pirie, British spy working for MI5 (d. 2008)
  1918   – Edward B. Giller, American Major General (d. 2017)
  1918   – Craig Stevens, American actor (d. 2000)
1919 – Walter Scheel, German soldier and politician, 4th President of West Germany (d. 2016)
1920 – Godtfred Kirk Christiansen, Danish businessman (d. 1995)
1921 – John Money, New Zealand psychologist and sexologist, known for his research on gender identity, and responsible for controversial involuntary sex reassignment of David Reimer  (d. 2006)
1923 – Harrison Dillard, American sprinter and hurdler (d. 2019)
  1923   – Val Bettin, American actor (d. 2021)
1924 – Johnnie Johnson, American pianist and songwriter (d. 2005)
  1924   – Charles C. Droz, American politician
1925 – Marco Cé, Italian cardinal (d. 2014)
  1925   – Arthur Imperatore Sr., Italian-American businessman (d. 2020)
  1925   – Bill Mackrides, American football quarterback (d. 2019)
  1925   – Dominique Nohain, French actor, screenwriter and director (d. 2017)
1926 – David Malet Armstrong, Australian philosopher and author (d. 2014)
  1926   – John Dingell, American lieutenant and politician (d. 2019)
  1926   – Martin Riesen, Swiss professional ice hockey goaltender (d. 2003)
  1926   – Elisabeth Kübler-Ross, Swiss-American psychiatrist and author (d. 2004)
1927 – Maurice Hayes, Irish educator and politician (d. 2017)
  1927   – Khensur Lungri Namgyel, Tibetan religious leader
  1927   – Bob Beckham, American country singer (d. 2013)
1928 – Balakh Sher Mazari, former prime minister of Pakistan (d. 2022)
1930 – Jerry Vale, American singer (d. 2014)
1933 – Antonio Lamer, Canadian lawyer and politician, 16th Chief Justice of Canada (d. 2007)
1934 – Raquel Correa, Chilean journalist (d. 2012)
  1934   – Marty Feldman, English actor and screenwriter (d. 1982)
  1934   – Edward D. DiPrete, American politician
1935 – John David Crow, American football player and coach (d. 2015)
  1935   – Steve Lawrence, American actor and singer
  1935   – Vitaly Sevastyanov, Russian engineer and cosmonaut (d. 2010) 
1938 – Diane Clare, English actress (d. 2013)
1939 – Ed Lumley, Canadian businessman and politician, 8th Canadian Minister of Communications
1940 – Joe B. Mauldin, American bass player and songwriter (d. 2015)
1941 – Dario Gradi, Italian-English footballer, coach, and manager
1942 – Phil Gramm, American economist and politician
1944 – Jaimoe, American drummer 
  1944   – Jeffrey Tambor, American actor and singer
1945 – Micheline Calmy-Rey, Swiss politician, 91st President of the Swiss Confederation
1947 – Kim Darby, American actress
  1947   – Jenny Diski, English author and screenwriter (d. 2016)
  1947   – Luis Fernando Figari, Peruvian religious leader, founded the Sodalitium Christianae Vitae
1948 – Raffi, Egyptian-Canadian singer-songwriter
  1948   – Ruby Sales, American civil-rights activist
1949 – Wolfgang Puck, Austrian-American chef, restaurateur and entrepreneur 
  1949   – Y. S. Rajasekhara Reddy, Indian politician, 14th Chief Minister of Andhra Pradesh (d. 2009)
1951 – Alan Ashby, American baseball player, manager, and sportscaster
  1951   – Anjelica Huston, American actress and director
1952 – Larry Garner, American singer-songwriter and guitarist
  1952   – Jack Lambert, American football player and sportscaster
  1952   – Marianne Williamson, American author and activist
1956 – Terry Puhl, Canadian baseball player and coach
1957 – Carlos Cavazo, Mexican-American guitarist and songwriter 
  1957   – Aleksandr Gurnov, Russian journalist and author
1958 – Kevin Bacon, American actor and musician
  1958   – Andreas Carlgren, Swedish educator and politician, 8th Swedish Minister for the Environment
  1958   – Tzipi Livni, Israeli lawyer and politician, 18th Justice Minister of Israel
1959 – Pauline Quirke, English actress
1960 – Mal Meninga, Australian rugby league player and coach
1961 – Ces Drilon, Filipino journalist
  1961   – Andrew Fletcher, English keyboard player (d. 2022)
  1961   – Toby Keith, American singer-songwriter, producer, and actor
  1961   – Karl Seglem, Norwegian saxophonist and record producer 
1962 – Joan Osborne, American singer-songwriter and guitarist 
1963 – Mark Christopher, American director and screenwriter
1964 – Alexei Gusarov, Russian ice hockey player and manager
1965 – Dan Levinson, American clarinet player, saxophonist, and bandleader
1966 – Ralf Altmeyer, German-Chinese virologist and academic
  1966   – Shadlog Bernicke, Nauruan politician
1967 – Jordan Chan, Hong Kong actor and singer
  1967   – Charlie Cardona, Colombian singer
1968 – Billy Crudup, American actor 
  1968   – Shane Howarth, New Zealand rugby player and coach
1969 – Sugizo, Japanese singer-songwriter, guitarist and producer
1970 – Beck, American singer-songwriter and producer
  1970   – Mark Butler, Australian politician
  1970   – Sylvain Gaudreault, Canadian educator and politician
  1970   – Todd Martin, American tennis player and coach
1971 – Neil Jenkins, Welsh rugby player and coach
1972 – Karl Dykhuis, Canadian ice hockey player
  1972   – Sourav Ganguly, Indian cricketer
  1972   – Shōsuke Tanihara, Japanese actor
1974 – Hu Liang, Chinese field hockey player
1976 – Talal El Karkouri, Moroccan footballer
  1976   – Ellen MacArthur, English sailor
1977 – Christian Abbiati, Italian footballer
  1977   – Paolo Tiralongo, Italian cyclist
  1977   – Milo Ventimiglia, American actor, director, and producer
  1977   – Wang Zhizhi, Chinese basketball player
  1978   – Urmas Rooba, Estonian footballer
1979 – Mat McBriar, American football player
  1979   – Ben Jelen, Scottish-American singer-songwriter
1980 – Eric Chouinard, American-Canadian ice hockey player
  1980   – Robbie Keane, Irish footballer
1981 – Wolfram Müller, German runner
  1981   – Anastasia Myskina, Russian tennis player
1982 – Shonette Azore-Bruce, Barbadian netball player
  1982   – Sophia Bush, American actress and director
  1982   – Hakim Warrick, American basketball player
1983 – John Bowker, American baseball player
  1983   – Rich Peverley, Canadian ice hockey player
1986 – Renata Costa, Brazilian footballer
1988 – Miki Roqué, Spanish footballer (d. 2012)
  1988   – Jesse Sergent, New Zealand cyclist
1989 – Yarden Gerbi, Israeli Judo champion
  1989   – Tor Marius Gromstad, Norwegian footballer (d. 2012)
1990 – Kevin Trapp, German footballer
1991 – Virgil van Dijk, Dutch footballer
1992 – Ariel Camacho, Mexican singer-songwriter (d. 2015)
  1992   – Son Heung-min, Korean footballer
1997 – Bryce Love, American football player
1998 – Jaden Smith, American actor and rapper
1999 – İpek Öz, Turkish tennis player

Deaths

Pre-1600
 689 – Kilian, Irish bishop
 810 – Pepin of Italy, son of Charlemagne (b. 773)
 873 – Gunther, archbishop of Cologne
 900 – Qatr al-Nada, wife of the Abbasid caliph al-Mu'tadid
 901 – Grimbald, French-English monk and saint (b. 827)
 975 – Edgar the Peaceful, English king (b. 943)
1153 – Pope Eugene III (b. 1087)
1253 – Theobald I of Navarre (b. 1201)
1261 – Adolf IV of Holstein, Count of Schauenburg
1390 – Albert of Saxony, Bishop of Halberstadt and German philosopher (b. circa 1320)
1538 – Diego de Almagro, Spanish general and explorer (b. 1475)

1601–1900
1623 – Pope Gregory XV (b. 1554)
1689 – Edward Wooster, English-American settler (b. 1622)
1695 – Christiaan Huygens, Dutch mathematician, astronomer, and physicist (b. 1629)
1716 – Robert South, English preacher and theologian (b. 1634)
1721 – Elihu Yale, American-English merchant and philanthropist (b. 1649)
1784 – Torbern Bergman, Swedish chemist and mineralogist (b. 1735)
1794 – Richard Mique, French architect (b. 1728)
1820 – Octavia Taylor, daughter of Zachary Taylor (b. 1816)
1823 – Henry Raeburn, Scottish portrait painter (b. 1756)
1822 – Percy Bysshe Shelley, English poet and playwright (b. 1792)
1850 – Prince Adolphus, Duke of Cambridge (b. 1774)
1859 – Oscar I of Sweden (b. 1799)
1873 – Franz Xaver Winterhalter, German painter and lithographer (b. 1805)
1887 – Ben Holladay, American businessman (b. 1819)
1895 – Johann Josef Loschmidt, Austrian chemist and physicist (b. 1821)

1901–present
1905 – Walter Kittredge, American violinist and composer (b. 1834)
1913 – Louis Hémon, French-Canadian author (b. 1880)
1917 – Tom Thomson, Canadian painter (b. 1877)
1930 – Joseph Ward, Australian-New Zealand businessman and politician, 17th Prime Minister of New Zealand (b. 1856)
1933 – Anthony Hope, English author and playwright (b. 1863)
1934 – Benjamin Baillaud, French astronomer and academic (b. 1848)
1939 – Havelock Ellis, English psychologist and author (b. 1859)
1941 – Moses Schorr, Polish rabbi, historian, and politician (b. 1874)
1942 – Louis Franchet d'Espèrey, Algerian-French general (b. 1856)
  1942   – Refik Saydam, Turkish physician and politician, 5th Prime Minister of Turkey (b. 1881)
1943 – Jean Moulin, French soldier (b. 1899)
1950 – Othmar Spann, Austrian sociologist, economist, and philosopher (b. 1878)
1952 – August Alle, Estonian lawyer, author, and poet (b. 1890)
1956 – Giovanni Papini, Italian journalist, author, and critic (b. 1881)
1965 – Thomas Sigismund Stribling, American lawyer and author (b. 1881)
1967 – Vivien Leigh, British actress (b. 1913)
1968 – Désiré Mérchez, French swimmer and water polo player (b. 1882)
1971 – Kurt Reidemeister, German mathematician connected to the Vienna Circle (b. 1893)
1972 – Ghassan Kanafani, Palestinian writer and politician (b. 1936)
1973 – Gene L. Coon, American screenwriter and producer (b. 1924)
  1973   – Ben-Zion Dinur, Russian-Israeli educator and politician, 4th Education Minister of Israel (b. 1884)
  1973   – Wilfred Rhodes, English cricketer and coach (b. 1877)
1979 – Sin-Itiro Tomonaga, Japanese physicist and academic, Nobel Prize laureate (b. 1906)
  1979   – Michael Wilding, English actor (b. 1912)
  1979   – Robert Burns Woodward, American chemist and academic, Nobel Prize laureate (b. 1917)
  1981   – Joe McDonnell (hunger striker), Irish Republican Army member (b. 1951)
1981 – Bill Hallahan, American baseball player (b. 1902)
1985 – Phil Foster, American actor and screenwriter (b. 1913)
  1985   – Jean-Paul Le Chanois, French actor, director, and screenwriter (b. 1909)
1986 – Skeeter Webb, American baseball player and manager (b. 1909)
1987 – Lionel Chevrier, Canadian lawyer and politician, 27th Canadian Minister of Justice (b. 1903)
  1987   – Gerardo Diego, Spanish poet and author (b. 1896)
1988 – Ray Barbuti, American runner and football player (b. 1905)
1990 – Howard Duff, American actor (b. 1913)
1991 – James Franciscus, American actor (b. 1934)
1993 – Abul Hasan Jashori, Bangladeshi Islamic scholar and freedom fighter (b. 1918)
1994 – Christian-Jaque, French director and screenwriter (b. 1904)
  1994   – Kim Il-sung, North Korean commander and politician, President of North Korea (b. 1912)
  1994   – Lars-Eric Lindblad, Swedish-American businessman and explorer (b. 1927)
  1994   – Dick Sargent, American actor (b. 1930)
1996 – Irene Prador, Austrian-born actress and writer (b. 1911)
1998 – Lilí Álvarez, Spanish tennis player, author, and feminist (b. 1905)
1999 – Pete Conrad, American captain, pilot, and astronaut (b. 1930)
2001 – John O'Shea, New Zealand director, producer, and screenwriter (b. 1920)
2002 – Ward Kimball, American animator and trombonist (b. 1914)
2004 – Paula Danziger, American author and educator (b. 1944)
2005 – Maurice Baquet, French actor and cellist (b. 1911) 
2006 – June Allyson, American actress and singer (b. 1917)
2007 – Chandra Shekhar, Indian lawyer and politician, 9th Prime Minister of India (b. 1927)
  2007   – Jack B. Sowards, American screenwriter and producer (b. 1929)
2008 – John Templeton, American-born British businessman and philanthropist (b. 1912)
2009 – Midnight, American singer-songwriter (b. 1962)
2011 – Roberts Blossom, American actor and poet (b. 1924)
  2011   – Betty Ford, First Lady of the United States (b. 1918)
2012 – Muhammed bin Saud Al Saud, Saudi Arabian politician (b. 1934)
  2012   – Ernest Borgnine, American actor (b. 1917)
  2012   – Gyang Dalyop Datong, Nigerian physician and politician (b. 1959)
  2012   – Martin Pakledinaz, American costume designer (b. 1953)
2013 – Dick Gray, American baseball player (b. 1931)
  2013   – Edmund Morgan, American historian and author (b. 1916)
  2013   – Claudiney Ramos, Brazilian footballer (b. 1980)
  2013   – Rubby Sherr, American physicist and academic (b. 1913)
  2013   – Sundri Uttamchandani, Indian author (b. 1924)
  2013   – Brett Walker, American songwriter and producer (b. 1961)
2014 – Plínio de Arruda Sampaio, Brazilian lawyer and politician (b. 1930)
  2014   – John V. Evans, American soldier and politician, 27th Governor of Idaho (b. 1925)
  2014   – Ben Pangelinan, Guamanian businessman and politician (b. 1956)
  2014   – Howard Siler, American bobsledder and coach (b. 1945)
  2014   – Tom Veryzer, American baseball player (b. 1953)
2015 – Ken Stabler, American football player and sportscaster (b. 1945)
  2015   – James Tate, American poet (b. 1943)
2016 – Abdul Sattar Edhi, Pakistani philanthropist (b. 1928)
2018 – Tab Hunter, American actor, pop singer, film producer and author (b. 1931)
2020 – Naya Rivera, American actress, model and singer (b. 1987)
  2020   – Alex Pullin, Australian snowboarder (b. 1987)
2022 – Shinzo Abe, Japanese politician who served as Prime Minister of Japan and President of the Liberal Democratic Party (LDP) from 2006 to 2007 and from 2012 to 2020. (b. 1954)
  2022   – Larry Storch, American actor and comedian (b. 1923)
  2022   – Luis Echeverría, Mexican lawyer and politician (b. 1922)
  2022   – Tony Sirico, American actor (b. 1942)

Holidays and observances
 Christian Feast Day:
 Abda and Sabas
 Auspicius of Trier
 Grimbald
 Kilian and Totnan
 Saints Peter and Fevronia Day (Russian Orthodox)
 Procopius of Scythopolis
 Sunniva and companions
 Theobald of Marly
 July 8 (Eastern Orthodox liturgics)
Air Force and Air Defense Forces Day (Ukraine)

References

External links

 
 
 

Days of the year
July